Paloma Creek South is a census-designated place (CDP) in eastern Denton County, Texas, United States. It is part of the Paloma Creek master-planned community. As of the 2010 census, Paloma Creek South had a population of 2,753.

Geography
Paloma Creek South is located south of U.S. Route 380 in an unincorporated area governed by the Denton County Fresh Water Supply Districts 8-A, 8-B, 11-A, 11-B, and 11-C.

Education
The entire Paloma Creek South census-designated place is within the Denton Independent School District. A portion of this section is zoned to Catherine Bell Elementary School, while another is zoned to Paloma Creek Elementary School. Most of the CDP is zoned to Navo Middle School, while a portion is zoned to Rodriguez Middle School. All of the CDP is zoned to Braswell High School.

Previously, all of the CDP was zoned to Paloma Creek Elementary, Navo Middle School, and Denton High School.

A good number of the houses in the southern area of the community south of Lake Meadow Ln, all not in the CDP, are located within the Little Elm Independent School District. There is an active homeschool community.

The majority of Denton County, Paloma Creek South included, is in the boundary of North Central Texas College.

See also
Paloma Creek, Texas

References

External links
Paloma Creek
Paloma Creek Homeowners Association

Dallas–Fort Worth metroplex
Census-designated places in Denton County, Texas
Census-designated places in Texas